Wormseed is a common name for several plants and may refer to:

 Dysphania anthelmintica (syn. Chenopodium ambrosioides var. anthelminticum), American wormseed, a medicinal herb from Central and South America. It was sometimes included in
 Dysphania ambrosioides (syn. Chenopodium ambrosioides), Mexican wormseed, Mexican tea, or epazote, a medicinal herb from Mexico and Central and South America
Artemisia cina, commonly known as santonica (zahr el shieh el -khorasani), Levant wormseed, and wormseed, is an Asian species of herbaceous perennial in the daisy family

References